Jan Kårström (born 6 December 1944) is a Swedish former wrestler who competed in the 1968 Summer Olympics and in the 1972 Summer Olympics.

References

External links
 

1944 births
Living people
Olympic wrestlers of Sweden
Wrestlers at the 1968 Summer Olympics
Wrestlers at the 1972 Summer Olympics
Swedish male sport wrestlers